is a 20th single by Japanese idol girl group AKB48, released on February 16, 2011.

Main song from this single was redone in Thai as B-track by BNK48 and released in 2022.

Release information
It is the 20th major-label single (22nd overall) released by AKB48. It was released in five versions: a limited type-A CD+DVD edition, a regular type-A CD+DVD edition, a limited type-B CD+DVD edition, a regular type-B CD+DVD edition, and a limited CD-only theater edition. The limited type-A and type-B editions came with a national handshaking event ticket, while the theater edition came with a "Sakura no Ki ni Narō" handshaking event ticket and one member picture at random. The title track was used as the theme song for the drama Sakura Kara no Tegami: AKB48 Sorezore no Sotsugyō Monogatari, which starred all AKB48 members. The single sold 655,344 copies on its first day of release, which is at the time, the most that any artist has sold in a single day since Oricon started reporting daily sales in March 2009.

When the music video published in YouTube, official discretion states that "The most heart-warming song in all of AKB48 history is born."

Track listing

Type-A CD track list
Sakura no Ki ni Narō (桜の木になろう)
Gūzen no Jūjiro (偶然の十字路) (Undergirls)
Kiss Made 100 Mile (キスまで100マイル) (MINT)
Sakura no Ki ni Narō off vocal ver.
Gūzen no Jūjiro off vocal ver.
Kiss Made 100 Mile off vocal ver.

Type-A DVD track list
Sakura no Ki ni Narō Music Clip
Gūzen no Jūjiro Music Clip
Kiss Made 100 Mile Music Clip
Members' Personal Clothes Fashion Show (Type-A) (ガチ私服ファッションショー（Type-A）)

Type-B CD track list
Sakura no Ki ni Narō (桜の木になろう)
Gūzen no Jūjiro (偶然の十字路) (Undergirls)
Area K (エリアK) (DIVA)
Sakura no Ki ni Narō off vocal ver.
Gūzen no Jūjiro off vocal ver.
Area K off vocal ver.

Type-B DVD track list
Sakura no Ki ni Narō Music Clip <Complete Version> (桜の木になろう　Music Clip＜完全版＞)
Gūzen no Jūjiro Music Clip
Area K Music Clip
Members' Personal Clothes Fashion Show (Type-B) (ガチ私服ファッションショー（Type-B）)

Theatre CD track list
Sakura no Ki ni Narō (桜の木になろう)
Gūzen no Jūjiro (偶然の十字路) (Undergirls)
Ōgon Center (黄金センター) (team Kenkyuusei)
Sakura no Ki ni Narō off vocal ver.
Gūzen no Jūjiro off vocal ver.
Ōgon Center off vocal ver.

Contributing members

"Sakura no Ki ni Narō"
Center: Atsuko Maeda
 Team A:  Haruna Kojima, Rino Sashihara, Mariko Shinoda, Aki Takajō, Minami Takahashi, Atsuko Maeda
 Team K: Tomomi Itano, Yuko Oshima, Minami Minegishi, Sae Miyazawa
 Team B: Tomomi Kasai, Yuki Kashiwagi, Rie Kitahara, Mayu Watanabe
 Team S (SKE48): Jurina Matsui, Rena Matsui

"Gūzen no Jūjiro"
Credited as "Undergirls"
Center: Yui Yokoyama, Kanon Kimoto.
Team A: Aika Ota, Haruka Nakagawa, Ami Maeda
Team K: Mayumi Uchida, Ayaka Kikuchi, Moeno Nito, Reina Fujie, Yui Yokoyama
Team B: Haruka Ishida, Manami Oku (last single), Mika Komori, Sumire Sato, Miho Miyazaki
Team S (SKE48): Masana Oya, Kumi Yagami
Team KII (SKE48): Akane Takayanagi, Manatsu Mukaida
Team E (SKE48): Kanon Kimoto

"Kiss Made 100 Mile"
Credited as "Mint"
 Team A: Haruka Katayama, Atsuko Maeda
 Team K: Moeno Nito, Sakiko Matsui
 Team B: Tomomi Kasai

"Area K"
Credited as "Diva"
 Team A: Misaki Iwasa, Shizuka Ōya, Asuka Kuramochi, Chisato Nakata, Sayaka Nakaya, Natsumi Matsubara
 Team K: Sayaka Akimoto, Ayaka Umeda, Miku Tanabe, Tomomi Nakatsuka, Misato Nonaka, Rumi Yonezawa
 Team B: Kana Kobayashi, Amina Sato, Natsuki Sato, Mariya Suzuki, Rina Chikano, Natsumi Hirajima, Yuka Masuda

"Ōgon Center"
Credited as "Team Kenkyūsei"
 9th Generation: Mina Oba, Haruka Shimazaki, Haruka Shimada, Miyu Takeuchi, Mariya Nagao, Mariko Nakamura, Anna Mori, Suzuran Yamauchi
 10th Generation: Maria Abe, Rina Izuta, Miori Ichikawa, Anna Iriyama, Rena Kato, Yuki Kanazawa, Marina Kobayashi, Shiori Nakamata, Nana Fujita
 11th Generation: Sara Ushikuba, Rina Kawaei, Natsuki Kojima, Shihori Suzuki, Wakana Natori, Ayaka Morikawa, Nau Yamaguchi

Oricon Charts (Japan)

References

2011 singles
2010s ballads
Pop ballads
Songs about school
AKB48 songs
Songs with lyrics by Yasushi Akimoto
Oricon Weekly number-one singles
Billboard Japan Hot 100 number-one singles
King Records (Japan) singles
Songs about cherry blossom
Japanese television drama theme songs